Tiller Upper Secondary School  is situated in Tiller in southern Trondheim, next to Rosten School and is run by Trøndelag county municipality. The school was founded in 1986, and is therefore one of the youngest high schools in the county. At the time of its founding, there were no reserved buildings for the institution and the school had to borrow buildings in central Heimdal in the initial phases. In 1999, however, the school could move into brand new buildings and has stayed there since.

The school's facilities for the students includes a library with computer terminals for database searches, and a canteen that serves hot and cold meals all school days. 

in August 2022, the new Tiller primary school will be opened for 750 pupils.

External links
 Official website 

Secondary schools in Norway
Education in Trondheim
Buildings and structures in Trondheim
Educational institutions established in 1986
1986 establishments in Norway
Trøndelag County Municipality